Decoding or decode may refer to: is the process of converting code into plain text or any format that is useful for subsequent processes.

Science and technology
 Decoding, the reverse of encoding
 Parsing, in computer science
 Digital-to-analog converter, "decoding" of a digital signal
 Phonics, decoding in communication theory
 Decode (Oracle)

Other uses
 deCODE genetics, a biopharmaceutical company based in Iceland
 "Decode" (song), a 2008 song by Paramore
 Decoding (semiotics), the interpreting of a message communicated to a receiver

See also
 Code (disambiguation)
 Decoder (disambiguation)
 Decoding methods, methods in communication theory for decoding codewords sent over a noisy channel
 Codec, a coder-decoder
 Recode (disambiguation)
 Video decoder, an electronic circuit

es:Descodificador